Study of the environmental impact of war focuses on the modernization of warfare and its increasing effects on the environment. Scorched earth methods have been used for much of recorded history. However, the methods of modern warfare cause far greater devastation on the environment. The progression of warfare from chemical weapons to nuclear weapons has increasingly created stress on ecosystems and the environment. Specific examples of the environmental impact of war include World War I, World War II, the Vietnam War, the Rwandan Civil War, the Kosovo War and the Gulf War.

Historical events

Vietnam 

The Vietnam War had significant environmental implications due to chemical agents which were used to destroy militarily-significant vegetation. Enemies found an advantage in remaining invisible by blending into a civilian population or taking cover in dense vegetation and opposing armies which targeted natural ecosystems. The US military used “more than 20 million gallons of herbicides [...] to defoliate forests, clear growth along the borders of military sites and eliminate enemy crops." The chemical agents gave the US an advantage in wartime efforts. However, the vegetation was unable to regenerate and it left behind bare mudflats which still existed years after spraying. Not only was the vegetation affected, but also the wildlife: "a mid-1980s study by Vietnamese ecologists documented just 24 species of birds and 5 species of mammals present in sprayed forests and converted areas, compared to 145–170 bird species and 30–55 kinds of mammals in intact forest." The uncertain long-term effects of these herbicides are now being discovered by looking at modified species distribution patterns through habitat degradation and loss in wetland systems, which absorbed the runoff from the mainland.

Africa 
Throughout Africa, war has been a major factor in the decline of wildlife populations inside national parks and other protected areas. However, a growing number of ecological restoration initiatives, including in Rwanda's Akagera National Park and Mozambique's Gorongosa National Park, have shown that wildlife populations and whole ecosystems can be successfully rehabilitated even after devastating conflicts. Experts have emphasized that solving social, economic, and political problems is essential for the success of such efforts.

Rwanda 
The Rwandan genocide led to the killing of roughly 800,000 Tutsis and moderate Hutus. The war created a massive migration of nearly 2 million Hutus fleeing Rwanda over the course of just a few weeks to refugee camps in Tanzania and now modern day the Democratic Republic of the Congo. This large displacement of people in refugee camps puts pressure on the surrounding ecosystem. Forests were cleared in order to provide wood for building shelters and creating cooking fires: “these people suffered from harsh conditions and constituted an important threat impact to natural resources.” Consequences from the conflict also included the degradation of National Parks and Reserves. Another big problem was that the population crash in Rwanda shifted personnel and capital to other parts of the country, thereby making it hard to protect wildlife.

World War II
World War II (WWII) drove a vast increase in production, militarized the production and transportation of commodities, and introduced many new environmental consequences, which can still be seen today. World War II was wide-ranging in its destruction of humans, animals, and materials. The postwar effects of World War II, both ecological and social, are still visible decades after the conflict ended.

During World War II, new technology was used to create aircraft, which were used to conduct air raids. During the war, aircraft were used to transport resources both to and from different military bases and drop bombs on enemy, neutral, and friendly targets alike. These activities damaged habitats.

Similar to wildlife, ecosystems also suffer from noise pollution which is produced by military aircraft. During World War II, aircraft acted as a vector for the transportation of exotics whereby weeds and cultivated species were brought to oceanic island ecosystems by way of aircraft landing strips which were used as refueling and staging stations during operations in the Pacific theater. Before the war, the isolated islands around Europe were inhabited by a high number of endemic species. During World War II, aerial warfare had an enormous influence on fluctuating population dynamics.

In August 1945, after fighting World War II for almost four years, the United States of America dropped an atomic bomb over the city of Hiroshima in Japan. About 70,000 people died in the first nine seconds after the bombing of Hiroshima, which was comparable to the death toll which resulted from the devastating Operation Meetinghouse air raid over Tokyo. Three days after the bombing of Hiroshima, the United States dropped a second atomic bomb on the industrial city of Nagasaki, instantly killing 35,000 people. The nuclear weapons released catastrophic levels of energy and radioactive particles. Once the bombs were detonated, the temperatures reached about 3980 °C / 7200 °F. With temperatures that high, all the flora and fauna were destroyed along with the infrastructure and human lives in the impact zones. The radioactive particles which were released resulted widespread land and water contamination. The initial blasts increased the surface temperature and created crushing winds destroying trees and buildings in their path.

European forests experienced traumatic impacts which resulted from fighting during the war. Behind the combat zones, timber from cut down trees was removed in order to clear up the paths for fighting. The shattered forests in the battle zones faced exploitation.

The use of heavily hazardous chemicals was first initiated during World War II. The long-term effects of chemicals result from both their potential persistence and the poor disposal program of nations with stockpiled weapons. During World War I (WW I), German chemists developed chlorine gas and mustard gas. The development of these gases led to many casualties, and lands were poisoned both on and near the battlefields.

Later in World War II, chemists developed even more harmful chemical bombs, which were packaged in barrels and directly deposited in the oceans. The disposal of the chemicals in ocean runs the risk of metal-based containers corroding and leaching the chemical contents of the vessel into the ocean. Through the chemical disposal in the ocean, the contaminants may be spread throughout the various components of the ecosystems damaging marine and terrestrial ecosystems.

Marine ecosystems during World War II were damaged not only from chemical contaminates, but also from wreckage from naval ships, which leaked oil into the water. Oil contamination in the Atlantic Ocean due to World War II shipwrecks is estimated at over 15 million tonnes. Oil spills are difficult to clean up and take many years to clean. To this day, traces of oil can still be found in the Atlantic Ocean from the naval shipwrecks which happened during World War II.

The use of chemicals during war helped increase the scale of chemical industries and it also helped to show the government the value of scientific research. The development of chemical research during the war also lead to the postwar development of agricultural pesticides. The creation of pesticides was an upside for the years after the war.

The environmental impacts of World War II were very drastic, which allowed them to be seen in the Cold War and be seen today. The impacts of conflict, chemical contaminations, and aerial warfare all contribute to reduction in the population of global flora and fauna, as well as a reduction in species diversity.

In 1946, in the U.S. Zone of Germany, the United States military advised the government to prepare accommodations and employment for the people who were bombed out of their cities. The answer was a special garden program that would provide new land for the people to live in. This included land to provide food needed for the people as well. Forests were then surveyed for good soil that was suitable for crop production.This meant that the forest would be cut down in order to make land for farms and housing.The forestry program would be used to exploit the forests of Germany for future resources and control the war potential of Germany. In this program about 23,500,000 fest meters of lumber were produced out of the forests.

Aluminum was one of the biggest resources affected by World War II. Bauxite, an aluminum ore and the mineral cryolite were essential, as well as requiring massive amounts of electrical power.

Gulf War and Iraq War

During the 1991 Gulf War, the Kuwaiti oil fires were a result of the scorched earth policy of Iraqi forces retreating from Kuwait. The Gulf War oil spill, regarded as the worst oil spill in history, was caused when Iraqi forces opened valves at the Sea Island oil terminal and dumped oil from several tankers into the Persian Gulf. Oil was also dumped in the middle of the desert.

Just before the 2003 Iraq War, Iraq also set fire to various oil fields.

Some American military personnel complained of Gulf War syndrome, typified by symptoms including immune system disorders and birth defects in their children. Whether it is due to time spent in active service during the war or for other reasons remains controversial.

Other examples 

1938 Yellow River flood, created by the Nationalist government in Central China during the early stages of the Second Sino-Japanese War in an attempt to halt the rapid advance of the Japanese forces. It has been called the "largest act of environmental warfare in history".
Beaufort's Dyke, used as a dumping ground for bombs
Jiyeh Power Station oil spill,  bombed by the Israeli Air Force during the 2006 Israel-Lebanon conflict.
Formerly Used Defense Sites, a U.S. military program which is responsible for environmental restoration
K5 Plan, an attempt by the government of the People's Republic of Kampuchea to seal off Khmer Rouge guerrilla infiltration routes into Cambodia between 1985 and 1989, resulting in environmental degradation.
Saudi Arabian-led intervention in Yemen, an intervention in a civil war in the Middle East, disrupted the water-energy-food security nexus in an already resource-poor country. The war and the conflict led to the contamination of water and agricultural lands.

Environmental hazards 

Resources are a key source of conflict between nations: "after the end of the Cold War in particular, many have suggested that environmental degradation will exacerbate scarcities and become an additional source of armed conflict." A nation's survival depends on resources from the environment. Resources that are a source of armed conflict include territory, strategic raw materials, sources of energy, water, and food. In order to maintain resource stability, chemical and nuclear warfare have been used by nations in order to protect or extract resources, and during conflict. These agents of war have been used frequently: “about 125,000 tons of chemical agent were employed during World War I, and about 96,000 tons during the Viet-Nam conflict.” Nerve gas, also known as organophosphorous anticholinesterases, was used at lethal levels against human beings and destroyed a high number of nonhuman vertebrate and invertebrate populations. However, contaminated vegetation would mostly be spared, and would only pose a threat to herbivores. The result of innovations in chemical warfare led to a broad range of different chemicals for war and domestic use, but also resulted in unforeseen environmental damage.

The progression of warfare and its effects on the environment continued with the invention of weapons of mass destruction. While today, weapons of mass destruction act as deterrents and the use of weapons of mass destruction during World War II created significant environmental destruction. On top of the great loss in human life, “natural resources are usually the first to suffer: forests and wild life animals are wiped out.” Nuclear warfare imposes both direct and indirect effects on the environment. The physical destruction due to the blast or by the biospheric damage due to ionizing radiation or radiotoxicity directly affect ecosystems within the blast radius. Also, the atmospheric or geospheric disturbances caused by the weapons can lead to weather and climate changes.

Unexploded ordnance

Military campaigns require large quantities of explosive weapons, a fraction of which will not detonate properly and leave unexploded weapons. This creates a serious physical and chemical hazard for the civilian populations living in areas which were once war zones, due to the possibility of detonation after the conflict, as well as the leaching of chemicals into the soil and groundwater.

Agent Orange

Agent Orange was one of the herbicides and defoliants used by the British military during the Malayan Emergency and the U.S. military in its herbicidal warfare program, Operation Ranch Hand, during the Vietnam War. An estimated 21,136,000 gal. (80 000 m³) of Agent Orange were sprayed across South Vietnam. According to the Vietnamese government, 4.8 million Vietnamese people to Agent Orange, and resulting in 400,000 deaths and disabilities, and 500,000 children born with birth defects. The Vietnamese Red Cross estimates that up to one million people were disabled or have health problems as a result of Agent Orange. The United States government has called these figures unreliable.

Many Commonwealth personnel who handled and/or used Agent Orange during and decades after the 1948–1960 Malayan conflict suffered from serious exposure of dioxin. Agent Orange also caused soil erosion to areas in Malaya. An estimated 10,000 civilians and insurgents in Malaya also suffered from the effects of defoliants, though many historians agreed it was likely more than 10,000 given that Agent Orange was used on a large scale in the Malayan Emergency and unlike the U.S., the British government manipulated the numbers and kept its deployment a secret in fear of a negative backlash from foreign nations.

Testing of nuclear armaments

Testing of nuclear armaments has been carried out at various places including Bikini Atoll, the Marshall Islands Pacific Proving Grounds, New Mexico in the US, Mururoa Atoll, Maralinga in Australia, and Novaya Zemlya in the former Soviet Union, among others.

Downwinders are individuals and communities who are exposed to radioactive contamination and/or nuclear fallout from atmospheric and/or underground nuclear weapons testing, and nuclear accidents.

Strontium-90
The United States government studied the post-war effects of Strontium-90, a radioactive isotope which is found in nuclear fallout . The Atomic Energy Commission discovered that “Sr-90, which is chemically similar to calcium, can accumulate in bones and possibly lead to cancer”. Sr-90 found its way into humans through the ecological food chain as fallout in the soil, was picked up by plants, further concentrated in herbivorous animals, and eventually consumed by humans.

Depleted uranium munitions

The use of depleted uranium in munitions is controversial because of numerous questions about potential long-term health effects.  Normal functioning of the kidney, brain, liver, heart, and numerous other systems can be affected by uranium exposure, because in addition to being weakly radioactive, uranium is a toxic metal. It remains weakly radioactive because of its long half-life. The aerosol produced during impact and combustion of depleted uranium munitions can potentially contaminate wide areas around the impact sites or can be inhaled by civilians and military personnel. In a three-week period of conflict in Iraq during 2003, it was estimated over 1000 tons of depleted uranium munitions were used mostly in cities. The U.S. Department of Defense claims that no human cancer of any type has been seen as a result of exposure to either natural or depleted uranium.

Yet, U.S. DoD studies using cultured cells and laboratory rodents continue to suggest the possibility of leukemogenic, genetic, reproductive, and neurological effects from chronic exposure.

In addition, the UK Pensions Appeal Tribunal Service in early 2004 attributed birth defect claims from a February 1991 Gulf War combat veteran to depleted uranium poisoning. Campaign Against Depleted Uranium (Spring, 2004) Also, a 2005 epidemiology review concluded: "In aggregate the human epidemiological evidence is consistent with increased risk of birth defects in offspring of persons exposed to DU."

According to a 2011 study by Alaani et al., depleted uranium exposure was either a primary cause or related to the cause of the birth defect and cancer increases. According to a 2012 journal article by Al-Hadithi et al., existing studies and research evidence does not show a "clear increase in birth defects" or a "clear indication of a possible environmental exposure including depleted uranium". The article further states that "there is actually no substantial evidence that genetic defects can arise from parental exposure to DU in any circumstances."

Fossil fuel use
With the high degree of mechanization of the military large amounts of fossil fuels are used. Fossil fuels are a major contributor to global warming and climate change, issues of increasing concern. Access to oil resources is also a factor for instigating a war.

The United States Department of Defense (DoD) is a government body with the highest use of fossil fuel in the world. According to the 2005 CIA World Factbook, when compared with the consumption per country the DoD would rank 34th in the world in average daily oil use, coming in just behind Iraq and just ahead of Sweden.

Waste incineration 
At U.S. bases during the 21st-century wars in Iraq and Afghanistan, human waste was burned in open pits along with munitions, plastic, electronics, paint, and other chemicals. The carcinogenic smoke is suspected to have injured some soldiers exposed to it.

Intentional flooding
Flooding can be used as scorched earth policy through using water to render land unusable. It can also be used to prevent the movement of enemy combatants. During the Second Sino-Japanese War, dykes on the Yellow and the Yangtze Rivers were breached to halt the advance of Japanese forces.  During the Siege of Leiden in 1573, the dykes were breached to halt the advance of Spanish forces. During Operation Chastise during the Second World War, the Eder and Sorpe river dams in Germany were bombed by the Royal Air Force, flooding a large area and halting industrial manufacture used by the Germans in the war effort.

Militarism and the environment 
Human security has traditionally been solely linked to military activities and defence. Scholars and institutions like the International Peace Bureau are now increasingly calling for a more holistic approach to security, particularly including an emphasis on the interconnections and interdependencies that exist between humans and the environment. Military activity has significant impacts on the environment. Not only can war be destructive to the socioenvironment, but military activities produce extensive amounts of greenhouse gases (that contribute to anthropogenic climate change), pollution, and cause resource depletion, among other environmental impacts.

Greenhouse gas emissions and pollution 
Several studies have found a strong positive correlation between military spending and increased greenhouse gas emissions, with the impact of military spending on carbon emissions being more pronounced for countries of the Global North (i.e.: OECD developed countries). Accordingly, the US military is estimated to be the number one fossil fuel consumer in the world.

Additionally, military activities involve high emissions of pollution. The Pentagon's director of environment, safety and occupational health, Maureen Sullivan, has stated that they work with approximately 39,000 contaminated sites. Indeed, the US military is also considered one of the largest generators of pollution in the world. Combined, the top five US chemical companies only produce one fifth of the toxins produced by the Pentagon. In Canada, the Department of National Defence readily admits it is the largest energy consumer of the Government of Canada, and a consumer of “high volumes of hazardous materials”.

Military pollution is a worldwide occurrence. Armed forces from around the world were responsible for the emission of two thirds of chlorofluorocarbons (CFCs) that were banned in the 1987 Montreal Protocol for causing damage to the ozone layer. In addition, naval accidents during the Cold War have dropped at minimum 50 nuclear warheads and 11 nuclear reactors into the ocean, they remain on the ocean floor.

Land and resource use 
Military land use needs (such as for bases, training, storage etc.) often displace people from their lands and homes. Military activity uses solvents, fuels and other toxic chemicals which can leach toxins into the environment that remain there for decades and even centuries. Furthermore, heavy military vehicles can cause damage to soil and infrastructure. Military-caused noise pollution can also diminish the quality of life for nearby communities as well as their ability to rear or hunt animals to support themselves. Advocates raise concerns of environmental racism and/or environmental injustice as it is largely marginalized communities that are displaced and/or affected.

Militaries are also highly resource intensive. Weapons and military equipment make up the second largest international trade sector. The International Peace Bureau says that more than fifty percent of the helicopters in the world are for military use, and approximately twenty-five percent of jet fuel consumption is by military vehicles. These vehicles are also extremely inefficient, carbon-intensive, and discharge emissions that are more toxic than those of other vehicles.

Activist responses 
Military funding is, at present, higher than ever before, and activists are concerned about the implication for greenhouse gas emissions and climate change. They advocate for demilitarization, citing the high greenhouse gas emissions and support the redirection of those funds to climate action. Currently the world spends about 2.2% of global GDP on military funding according to the World Bank. It is estimated that it would cost approximately one percent of global GDP yearly until 2030 to reverse the climate crisis. Moreover, activists emphasize the need for prevention and the avoidance of costly clean up. Currently, the expense for cleaning up military contaminated site is at least $500 billion. Finally, activists point to social issues such as extreme poverty and advocate for more funding to be redirected from military expenses to these causes.

Groups working for demilitarization and peace include the International Peace Bureau, Canadian Voice of Women for Peace, The Rideau Institute, Ceasefire.ca, Project Ploughshares, and Codepink. See List of anti-war organizations for more groups.

Militaries' positive effects on the environment 
There are examples from around the world of nations’ armed forces aiding in land management and conservation. For example, in Bhuj, India, military forces stationed there helped to reforest the area; in Pakistan, the Army took part in the Billion tree tsunami, working with civilians to reforest land in KPK and Punjab.; in Venezuela, it is part of the National Guard’s responsibilities to protect natural resources. Additionally, military endorsement of environmentally friendly technology such as renewable energy may have the potential to generate public support for these technologies. Finally, certain military technologies like GPS and drones are helping environmental scientists, conservationists, ecologists and restoration ecologists conduct better research, monitoring, and remediation.

War and environmental law

From a legal standpoint, environmental protection during times of war and military activities is addressed partially by international environmental law.  Further sources are also found in areas of law such as general international law, the laws of war, human rights law and local laws of each affected country.
Several United Nations treaties, including the Fourth Geneva Convention, the 1972 World Heritage Convention and the 1977 Environmental Modification Convention have provisions to limit the environmental impacts of war.

The Environmental Modification Convention is an international treaty prohibiting the military or other hostile use of environmental modification techniques having widespread, long-lasting or severe effects. The Convention bans weather warfare, which is the use of weather modification techniques for the purposes of inducing damage or destruction. This treaty is in force and has been ratified (accepted as binding) by leading military powers.

See also
Biological warfare
Chemical warfare
Environmental effects of the Syrian Civil War
Environmental impact of the 2022 Russian invasion of Ukraine
List of environmental issues
Nuclear warfare
Nuclear winter
Scorched earth
Unconventional warfare
Well poisoning
War crimes

References

Further reading

External links
Protection of the Environment During Armed Conflict
Armed Conflict and Protection of the Environment 
Addressing Environmental Consequences of War A program of the Environmental Law Institute
Armed Conflict and the Environment: IUCN Statement

 
Aftermath of war